South Australia is distinctly divided into two main areas; the well watered and populated southeastern corner and the arid outback for the rest of the state. As a result, highways are concentrated mainly in the southeast. The Eyre Highway to Perth and Stuart Highway to Darwin are the only significant highways for the remaining part of the state. The remaining roads are outback tracks. This is the list of highways in South Australia.

Road numbering
Since 1955 South Australia had major rural roads numbered as part of national routes and Highways. In 1998/1999 South Australia introduced "Trailblazers" with A, B and M route numbers in the Metropolitan area and tourist areas of Victor Harbour and the Barossa Valley. This system was extended to cover country uouverreas starting in 1999/2000.

These route numbers are used on signs and maps and distinct from the four digit numbers for major roads and eight digit numbers for streets used internally by the Highways Depar Brasil Lixo

Expressways

In South Australia, expressway may refer to a controlled access highway with no at-grade intersections or a limited access road of slightly lower standard with at-grade intersections at some locations. Currently there are three constructed expressways in Adelaide:
 Port River Expressway , completed in 2008
 Northern Expressway , completed in 2010
 North–South Motorway, made up of (from north to south)
 the Northern Connector, completed in 2020;
 the South Road Superway, completed in 2014;
 the Regency Road to Pym Street stretch, completed in 2021;
 the Torrens to Torrens, completed in 2018
 the Torrens to Darlington project , construction due to start 2023; 
 The Gateway South Project (extended the Southern Expressway from Darlington to Tonsley, completed 2019)
 Southern Expressway  (formerly the world's longest reversible one way freeway), completed in 1997, with duplication completed in 2014

National highways

Metropolitan
 South Eastern Freeway northwestern end
 Northern Expressway
 Port Wakefield Road
 South Road
 Salisbury Highway
 Grand Junction Road

Hampstead Road
Taunton Road
Ascot Avenue
Lower Portrush Road
Portrush Road

Rural
 South Eastern Freeway – Majority

Eyre Highway
Augusta Highway
Port Wakefield Highway
Princes Highway
 Dukes Highway
 Sturt Highway
 Stuart Highway

State highways

Metropolitan
 City Ring Route, Adelaide
 Port Wakefield Road
 Southern Expressway
 Main South Road 
 Cross Road
 Anzac Highway
 Sir Donald Bradman Drive
 Port Road
 Port River Expressway
 Salisbury Highway
 North East Road (Adelaide–Mannum Road)
 Lower North East Road
 Marion Road
 Tapleys Hill Road
 Grand Junction Road
 Portrush Road
 McIntyre Road
 Main North Road
 Torrens Road

Rural
 Princes Highway
 Princes Highway
 Mallee Highway
 Barossa Valley Way
 
Main South Road
Playford Highway
 Barrier Highway
 Karoonda Highway
 Wilmington–Ucolta Road

Browns Well Highway
Ngarkat Highway
Naracoorte Road
 Goyder Highway
 Riddoch Highway
 RM Williams Way
 Horrocks Highway
 Flinders Ranges Way
 Copper Coast Highway
 Yorke Highway
 St Vincent Highway
 Tod Highway
 Birdseye Highway

Flinders Highway
Lincoln Highway
 Southern Ports Highway

Major arterial roads

Glen Osmond Road
Main North Road
 South Road 
 Cross Road

Sir Donald Bradman Drive
Burbridge Road
 Port Road

Adelaide–Mannum Road
North East Road
 Victor Harbor Road
 
Tapleys Hill Road
Brighton Road
Ocean Boulevard
Lonsdale Road
Dyson Road

Grand Junction Road
Victoria Road

Mcintyre Road
Kings Road

Mount Barker Road
Strathalbyn Road

Onkaparinga Valley Road
Echunga Road
Battunga Road
Brookman Road
Old Willunga Hill Road (Brookman Rd to Victor Harbor Rd)
Victor Harbor Rd (Old Willunga Hill Rd to Pages Flat Rd, also A13)
Pages Flat Road
 Wellington Road

Main North Road
Wilmington-Ucolta Road
 Wilmington-Ucolta Road
 Main North Road

Outback tracks

Although not highways as such, unsealed outback tracks form important links to remote communities and areas, the significant ones include;

Anne Beadell Highway
Birdsville Track
Gunbarrel Highway
Oodnadatta Track
Strzelecki Track

See also

 Highways in Australia for highways in other states and territories
 List of highways in Australia for roads named as highways, but not necessarily classified as highways
 Metropolitan Adelaide Transport Study
 List of numbered roads in South Australia

References

 01
Highways
South Australia
Highways

Google.com.br